The 1924 Rhode Island gubernatorial election was held on November 4, 1924. Republican nominee Aram J. Pothier defeated Democratic nominee Felix A. Toupin with 58.56% of the vote.

General election

Candidates
Major party candidates
Aram J. Pothier, Republican
Felix A. Toupin, Democratic

Other candidates
Edward W. Theinert, Workers
Charles F. Bishop, Socialist Labor
Frederick W. Hurst, Socialist

Results

References

1924
Rhode Island
Gubernatorial